Stictonaclia is a genus of moths in the subfamily Arctiinae.

Species
 Stictonaclia anastasia Oberthür, 1893
 Stictonaclia andriai Griveaud, 1964
 Stictonaclia blandina (Oberthür, 1893)
 Stictonaclia marojejyensis Griveaud, 1964
 Stictonaclia myodes Guérin-Meneville, 1893
 Stictonaclia reducta Mabille, 1878
 Stictonaclia seyrigi Griveaud, 1964
 Stictonaclia subflava Griveaud, 1964

Former species
 Stictonaclia amplificata (Saalmüller, 1880)

References

Natural History Museum Lepidoptera generic names catalog

Arctiinae